Crawford Priory is an estate house about 2 miles south west of Cupar, Fife, based on private land with no single owner. It is a former residence of the Earls of Crawford, Earls of Glasgow and Barons Cochrane of Cults. It lies just outside the village of Springfield.

Originally built as Crawford Lodge by the 21st Earl of Crawford in 1758, it was substantially enlarged and extended in the early nineteenth century by a sister of the 22nd Earl, Lady Mary Lindsay Crawford. 

Lady Mary engaged architects David Hamilton, and then James Gillespie Graham, to redesign the building in the gothic style, adding buttresses, turrets and pinnacles effecting the look of a priory, although it had had no religious history. 

Lady Mary's heirs, the Earls of Glasgow, further developed the house. In 1871 the 6th Earl of Glasgow built a chapel in the east front. However huge debts forced the 7th Earl to sell off all his estates in order to retain the family seat at Kelburn, near Largs. 

The house then passed to the politician Thomas Cochrane, son-in-law of the 6th Earl of Glasgow. An outlying estate at Priestfield was sold out of the family to the Martin (later Martin Smith Martin and Martin Smith) family at this time. Cochrane was created Baron Cochrane of Cults in 1919. Further remodelling was undertaken in the 1920s by Reginald Fairlie, including the removal of the porte cochere to the west front. After the death of the 2nd Baron in 1968 the house was closed, and gradually fell into disrepair and ruin. There are no significant remains of the internal gothic design save a cast iron balustrade in the D-shaped main stairhall in the east side of the building.

See also 

 List of listed buildings in Cults, Fife

References

External links 
Crawford Priory (LB2567) at Historic Environment Scotland
Crawford Priory (1294) at Buildings at Risk Register for Scotland
Crawford Priory (31613) at Canmore
Images of Crawford Priory at Canmore

Houses completed in 1758
Country houses in Fife
James Gillespie Graham buildings
Ruins in Fife
1758 establishments in Scotland